John Jeffery may refer to:

 John Jeffery (rugby union) (born 1945), Wales rugby union international
 John Jeffery (South African politician), South African politician
 John Jeffery (priest) (1647–1720), Anglican priest and author
 John Jeffery (MP) (c. 1751–1822), MP for Poole, 1796–1809

See also  
 John Jeffrey (disambiguation)